The Bridge School is a former school building located in rural Raisinville Township in the U.S. state of Michigan.  It is recognized as the first public school in the Territory of Michigan when it was founded in 1828.  The school district closed in 1946, and the building has served as Raisinville Township Hall since 1982.  The Bridge School was listed as a Michigan State Historic Site on December 17, 1987.

Description
The first structure known as the Bridge School was constructed in 1828 and rebuilt in 1832.  It was a simple log cabin schoolhouse built using wood from walnut trees.  The log cabin was replaced with the current brick structure in 1868.  The structure is a one-story, end-gable, solid red-brick, vernacular building with a tin roof.  It sits atop a limestone foundation.  The schoolhouse originally contained two rooms.  In 1910, a significantly large addition was added to the brick structure using the same architectural designs.

Early history
The passage of the first public school law by the Legislative Council of the Michigan Territory on April 12, 1827 made education a municipal responsibility and required local governments to organize their own school systems.  Soon after, the Bridge School opened on April 17, 1828 as the first public school building in the Michigan Territory.  The Bridge School was not the first educational facility built in the territory, as numerous private and religious institutions predated 1828, as did the University of Michigan, which was established 10 years earlier in Detroit.  At the time, the Michigan Territory only had two formally organized counties: Monroe County and Wayne County.  Monroe County, where the Bridge School was located, only had a population of 336 at the 1820 census.

The new district would receive taxpayer funding from the government of the Michigan Territory and is recognized as the first district of its kind in the territory that later became the state of Michigan in 1837. It was built on land deeded by George Sorter. The original log structure was eventually replaced by a two-room brick schoolhouse in 1868. Several more rooms were built in a large addition to the brick structure in 1910.

On the centennial anniversary of the Bridge School in 1928, an obelisk was erected in front of the building.  The obelisk was constructed with stones that current students and past alumni brought for the celebration.  The obelisk, which still stands in its original spot, reads:

Recent history
The Bridge School served as a functioning educational facility for 118 years from 1828–1946.  The building ceased operation as an educational facility in 1946 and was completely shuttered in 1950.  When the school closed, students were absorbed into Dundee Community Schools in neighboring Dundee Township.  Dundee Community Schools took ownership of the now-defunct Bridge School, but the structure remained vacant.

Shortly after in 1956, the board of education for Dundee Community Schools donated the unused building to the Monroe County Historical Society.  The property was later deeded to Raisinville Township in 1980.  The township renovated the structure and converted it into their township hall in 1982, and it served as a polling place for the first time that year as well.  The Bridge School was recognized as a Michigan State Historic Site on December 17, 1987.  A historic marker detailing the school's history was erected by the Monroe County Historical Society.  The structure continues to serve as the township hall for Raisinville Township.  The hall is located at 96 Ida Maybee Road just north of M-50 (South Custer Road).  Ida Maybee Road was once designated as part of M-130 when it was a state highway from 1929–1955.

Images

References

Buildings and structures in Monroe County, Michigan
Education in Monroe County, Michigan
Defunct schools in Michigan
Schoolhouses in Michigan
Educational institutions established in 1828
Educational institutions disestablished in 1946
Michigan State Historic Sites in Monroe County
School buildings completed in 1868
1828 establishments in Michigan Territory
1946 disestablishments in Michigan